Yeed, also spelled Yed, is a town in the southwestern Bakool region of Somalia. It is situated in the Yed.
Yeed waa tuulo katirsan gobolka bakool waxeyna hoos tagtaa degmada Rabdhuure.

References

Yeed, Somalia

Populated places in Bakool